Japanese Breakfast is an indie pop band headed by Korean-American musician Michelle Zauner. Zauner started the band as a side project in 2013, when she was leading the Philadelphia-based emo group Little Big League. She has said that she named the band after seeing a GIF of Japanese breakfast and deciding that the term would be considered "exotic" to Americans; she also thought it would make others wonder what a Japanese breakfast consists of.

In 2014, she returned to her hometown of Eugene, Oregon, to care for her ailing mother. She continued to record music and songs, first to cope with stress, then, after her mother died, with grief. The songs eventually became Japanese Breakfast's debut studio album: Psychopomp (2016), released by Yellow K Records. Its critical and commercial success led Japanese Breakfast to sign with the record label Dead Oceans, which released the band's second and third studio albums: Soft Sounds from Another Planet (2017) and Jubilee (2021). Jubilee was nominated for Best Alternative Music Album and Japanese Breakfast for Best New Artist at the 64th Annual Grammy Awards and became the band's first album to chart on the Billboard 200, where it peaked at 56.

History

2013–2016: Early releases and Psychopomp 
The first Japanese Breakfast release was June (2013), the result of a month-long project in which Zauner and Rachel Gagliardi recorded one song a day and posted them on the Tumblr blog rachelandmichelledojune.

In 2014, Zauner participated as Japanese Breakfast in a song project with musicians Gabrielle Smith, Florist, Frankie Cosmos, and Small Wonder, who posted songs daily on the Tumblr blog may5to12songs. She released her songs from the project on Bandcamp as two digital albums: Where Is My Great Big Feeling?, released on June 6; and American Sound on June 24. Both were released weeks later as the cassette tape American Sound/Where Is My Great Big Feeling.

While in Oregon with her family in 2014, Zauner continued recording as Japanese Breakfast, starting with samples of music as a meditative exercise and "instant gratification". She said she had more to say after Tropical Jinx, the 2014 studio album by her emo group Little Big League.

In 2015, while working at an advertising agency, Zauner recorded her first studio album as Japanese Breakfast: Psychopomp, named for the mythological creature. She said her "dark and heavy-handed" record dealt with her mother's death, although she tried to make the music urgent and "sonically upbeat." The album's rollout on Yellow K Records began in January 2016 with the release of the single "In Heaven" via Stereogum. A second single, titled "Everybody Wants to Love You" was released on February 18, 2016, and the album itself was released on April 1, 2016. Around this time, Japanese Breakfast signed with Dead Oceans, which on June 23, 2016, announced the signing and said Psychopomp would be re-released internationally. A music video for "Jane Cum" was also released the same day. To promote the album, the band opened for Japanese-American singer-songwriter Mitski alongside American musician Jay Som and released a music video for the song "Everybody Wants to Love You" which was later ranked as the 154th best song of the 2010s decade by Quinn Moreland of Pitchfork.

2017–2018: Soft Sounds from Another Planet 
On May 4, 2017, Japanese Breakfast released the single "Machinist" and announced the upcoming release of a second studio album, Soft Sounds from Another Planet, whose lyrics are largely concerned with Zauner's detachment and trauma. The song "Boyish" was released as a single on June 7, 2017. A third single from the album, "Road Head", was released on July 6, 2017. The full album was released on July 14, 2017. To promote the album, the band released a video game, "Japanese BreakQuest", in which the main character, "J-Brekkie", gathers a band to prevent an alien invasion. The game was developed by Zauner and game designer Elaine Fath, and uses songs from the album, rendered as 8-bit MIDI tracks by Peter Bradley. To support the album, Japanese Breakfast toured Oceania, Asia and North America from 2017 to 2019. Along the way, the band opened for English shoegaze band Slowdive, American musician (Sandy) Alex G, and Canadian duo Tegan and Sara.

On October 19, 2017, a music video for "Body is a Blade" was released. It was animated using old family photographs and video of Zauner visiting locations from the photos. She described it as "a really personal mixed media piece, almost like a moving scrapbook". On February 13, 2018, the music video for "Boyish" was released. It depicts a girl going to a high school dance, where Zauner and her band, accompanied by fellow indie musician Leslie Bear, are playing a set. The video also features a cameo appearance by musician Lindsey Jordan and was directed by Zauner, who at the time of its release described it as her "favorite video yet" and has retrospectively considered it to be her "magnum opus".

2018–present: Jubilee and Sable

In 2018, indie game developer Shedworks sent Zauner preliminary images from their video game Sable and commissioned her to write its soundtrack. Unlike the pop songs she writes for Japanese Breakfast, the Sable soundtrack is mostly ambient music. Zauner took inspiration from other game soundtracks, notably the soundtracks to the Final Fantasy games, Secret of Mana (1993), Chrono Cross (1999) and two games in The Legend of Zelda series: Majora's Mask (2000) and Breath of the Wild (2017). Her commission was announced during E3 2018. The game was to be released in 2019, but was delayed twice. In 2020, during the COVID-19 lockdown, Zauner began reworking the songs after playing updated versions of the game. The game and its soundtrack were released on September 23, 2021.

In 2019, Japanese Breakfast released two singles under the W Hotels music label: "Essentially" and a cover of the Tears for Fears song "Head over Heels." Zauner recorded the singles in Bali, which she described as a "glamorous change" because she had typically recorded in "cold studios." Proceeds from the latter single were donated to the American Civil Liberties Union. That year, Zauner told Flood Magazine that she aimed to make a "fun album" for Japanese Breakfast's third album. This would manifest as Jubilee, her second studio album for the Dead Oceans label.

The rollout of Jubilee began on March 2, 2021, with the release of the album's lead single, "Be Sweet", and a video for the song. Two other singles—"Posing in Bondage" and "Savage Good Boy"—were released before the album itself dropped on June 4. Zauner said the album was inspired by joy, in contrast to earlier Japanese Breakfast albums, and that she was inspired to "go big" by Icelandic musician Björk's third album, Homogenic (1997). Jubilee was nominated for the Grammy Award for Best Alternative Music Album and Japanese Breakfast for the Grammy Award for Best New Artist, but lost at the 64th Annual Grammy Awards to St. Vincent's album Daddy's Home and to Olivia Rodrigo. On August 7, Japanese Breakfast embarked on the Jubilee Tour.

In March 2022, Japanese Breakfast announced that they would open for English indie rock band Florence and the Machine and American indie rock bands the National and the Yeah Yeah Yeahs.

In mid-2022, Japanese Breakfast and Chicago-based Goose Island Brewery teamed up to produce a limited-edition lager named "Be Sweet" after the song. The beer was sold at the Pitchfork Music Festival in July 2022; proceeds were donated to Heart of Dinner, a charity that helps elderly Asian-Americans who struggle with food insecurity in New York City.

Musical style 

Japanese Breakfast's sound has primarily been described as indie pop containing elements of experimental pop, lo-fi, dream pop and indie rock. The band's early releases, including Psychopomp, have been described as lo-fi while later releases, including the band's second and third albums, Soft Sounds from Another Planet and Jubilee have primarily been labeled as indie pop with elements of shoegaze and chamber pop. Sable has been described as ambient music.

The band has re-recorded and re-released songs to give them wider audiences. Psychopomp includes songs from American Sound and Where Is My Great Big Feeling. Soft Sounds includes "Boyish", originally released as "Day 6" on June. Jubilee includes "In Hell", originally a bonus track on the Japanese deluxe edition of Soft Sounds.

Discography

Studio albums

Soundtrack albums

Compilation albums

EPs

Singles

As featured artist

Music videos

Notes

Tour

Headlining
 Psychopomp Tour (2016–2017)
 Soft Sounds from Another Planet Tour (2017–2019)
 Jubilee Tour (2021–2022)

Awards and nominations

References

External links

 
 
 
 

2013 establishments in Oregon
Dead Oceans artists
Downtempo musicians
Dream pop musical groups
Indie pop groups
Indie rock musical groups from Oregon
Musical groups established in 2013